Violetta Vitalyevna Kolobova (born 27 July 1991) is a Russian right-handed épée fencer, 2012 team European champion, two-time individual European champion, two-time team world champion, two-time Olympian, and 2016 team Olympic bronze medalist.

Biography 
Kolobova took up fencing in 2001, encouraged by her mother.  She married fellow Russian Olympian Roman Vlasov in 2019.

Medal Record

Olympic Games

World Championship

European Championship

Grand Prix

World Cup

References

External links

 
  (archive)
  (archive)
 
 
 

Russian female épée fencers
1991 births
Living people
Olympic fencers of Russia
Fencers at the 2012 Summer Olympics
Fencers at the 2016 Summer Olympics
Olympic bronze medalists for Russia
Olympic medalists in fencing
Medalists at the 2016 Summer Olympics
People from Dzerzhinsk, Russia
Fencers at the 2020 Summer Olympics
Sportspeople from Nizhny Novgorod Oblast
21st-century Russian women